A courtesy title is a form of address in systems of nobility used for children, former wives and other close relatives of a peer, as well as certain officials such as some judges and members of the Scottish gentry. These styles are used "by courtesy" in the sense that persons referred to by these titles do not themselves hold substantive titles. There are several different kinds of courtesy titles in the British peerage system.

Children of peers

Courtesy titles 

If a peer of one of the top three ranks of the peerage (a duke, marquess or earl) has more than one title, his eldest son – himself not a peer – may use one of his father's lesser titles "by courtesy". However, the father continues to be the substantive holder of the peerage title, and the son is only using the title by courtesy, unless issued a writ of acceleration. The eldest son of the eldest son of a duke or marquess may use a still lower title, if one exists. In legal documents, the courtesy title is implied but not used directly, e.g. the name of the person is given then "commonly called [title]".

For example, the Duke of Norfolk is also the Earl of Arundel and Baron Maltravers. His eldest son is therefore styled "Earl of Arundel" (without the definite article "The" which indicates a substantive title). Lord Arundel's eldest son (should he have one during his father's lifetime) would be styled "Lord Maltravers". However, only the Duke of Norfolk is actually a peer; his son Lord Arundel and his hypothetical grandson Lord Maltravers are not.

Courtesy titles are only used by the peer's eldest living son, and the eldest son's eldest living son, and so forth. Other descendants are not permitted to use the peer's subsidiary titles. Only the heir apparent (and heir apparent to the heir apparent, and so on) may use them. An heir presumptive (e.g., a brother, nephew, or cousin) does not use a courtesy title. However, Scottish practice allows the style Master/Mistress of X to an heir presumptive as well as to an heir apparent; for example, the brother of the present Marquess of Tweeddale, Lord Alistair Hay, has the title Master of Tweeddale.

Holders of courtesy titles do not, at the Court of St James's, have their title preceded by the definite article "The": e.g., 'Earl of Arundel' rather than 'the Earl of Arundel'.

Wives are entitled to use the feminine form of their husbands' courtesy titles. Thus, the wife of an Earl of Arundel would be styled "Countess of Arundel" (again, without the article).

The children (either male or female) of holders of courtesy titles bear the styles as would be theirs if their fathers actually held the peerages by which they were known: e.g., Serena Stanhope, daughter of Viscount Petersham (heir to the Earl of Harrington) had the style of The Honourable, which is reserved for daughters of viscounts and barons, a title which her father only held by courtesy.

Choosing a courtesy peer's title
The actual courtesy title which is used is a matter of family tradition. For instance, the eldest son of The Duke of Buccleuch and Queensberry is styled "Earl of Dalkeith", even though the duke is also The Marquess of Dumfriesshire, a title which outranks the earldom. Similarly, the eldest son of The Marquess of Londonderry is styled "Viscount Castlereagh", even though the marquess is also The Earl Vane.

Titles with the same name as a peer's main title are not used as courtesy titles. For instance, The Duke of Westminster is also The Marquess of Westminster and The Earl Grosvenor (amongst other titles). The duke's heir apparent (when there is one) is not styled "Marquess of Westminster", which would cause confusion between the son and the father, and so is styled "Earl Grosvenor" instead.

The title used does not have to be exactly equivalent to the actual peerage. For example, the eldest son of The Duke of Wellington is usually styled "Marquess of Douro", although the actual peerage possessed by his father is Marquess Douro (not of Douro).

If a peer of the rank of earl or above does not have any subsidiary titles of a name different from his main title, his eldest son usually uses an invented courtesy title of "Lord [Surname]". For instance, the eldest son of The Earl of Devon is styled "Lord Courtenay", even though the Earl has no barony of that name; similarly, the eldest son of The Earl of Guilford is styled "Lord North". The eldest son of The Earl of Huntingdon, who has no subsidiary titles, is styled "Viscount Hastings" to avoid confusion with The Lord Hastings, a substantive peer. The heir of The Earl Castle Stewart uses the style "Viscount Stewart" in order to avoid confusion with Lord Stewart, the eldest son of Viscount Castlereagh (the eldest son of The Marquess of Londonderry).

Courtesy style of "Lord" 
The honorific courtesy style of "Lord" before the given name is accorded to younger sons of dukes and marquesses. The style is always added before the person's given name and surname, as in the example of Lord Randolph Churchill, although conversational usage drops the surname on secondary reference. It is never used before the person's surname alone, and is not considered a 'title' under peerage law.

The title persists after the death of the holder's father, but is not inherited by any of his children. The wife of the holder is entitled to the feminine form of her husband's style, which takes the form of "Lady", followed by her husband's given name and surname, as in the example of Lady Randolph Churchill. The holder is addressed as "Lord Randolph" and his wife as "Lady Randolph".

Courtesy style of "Lady" 
The honorific courtesy style of "Lady" is used for the daughters of dukes, marquesses, and earls. The courtesy title is added before the person's given name, as in the examples Lady Diana Spencer and Lady Henrietta Waldegrave. Because it is merely a courtesy with no legal implications, the honorific persists after the death of the holder's father but it is not inherited by her children. The courtesy style is never used immediately before the surname alone.

The honorific "Lady" is also used before the first name of Ladies Companion of the Order of the Garter and Ladies of the Order of the Thistle who do not hold another title or style. 

The spouse of a woman with a courtesy style does not hold any courtesy style in right of their spouse; neither does the husband of a person with any style or title (including the husband of a peer).

Courtesy style of "The Honourable" 
The younger sons of earls, along with all sons and daughters of viscounts, barons and lords of parliament are accorded the courtesy style of "The Honourable" before their name; one example is Vita Sackville-West. This is usually abbreviated to "The Hon." The style persists after the death of the holder's father, but it may not be inherited by the holder's children. It is used only in third person reference, not in speaking to the person.

Married daughters
The daughter of a duke, marquess, or earl who marries an untitled man becomes "Lady [Given name] [Husband's surname]"; an example from fiction is Lady Catherine de Bourgh in Pride and Prejudice, who married the untitled knight (or baronet) Sir Louis de Bourgh and therefore retains her courtesy style. The daughter of a viscount or baron who marries a commoner is styled "The Honourable [Given name] [Husband's surname]".

Any woman who marries a peer uses the feminine version of his peerage title, even if her own precedence is higher than his, as in the case of a duke's daughter marrying a baron, because a peerage is a substantive title, the usage of which is preferred to any courtesy style – unless she marries into the Royal Family. If a woman marries the younger son of a duke or marquess, she becomes "Lady [Husband's given name] [Husband's surname]." If she marries the younger son of an earl, eldest or younger son of viscount or baron, she becomes "The Hon. Mrs [Husband's given name] [Husband's surname]."

In case of a divorce, she may keep the same style as during marriage or she may choose to assume the style "Mrs [Given name] [Husband's surname]." Regardless of what she chooses, she loses all precedence acquired from marriage and because of the former option, there can be multiple Lady John Smiths.

Adoption
Until 2004, children who had been adopted by peers had no right to any courtesy title. Pursuant to a Royal Warrant dated 30 April 2004, these children are now automatically entitled to the same styles and courtesy titles as their siblings. However, unlike biological children, they cannot inherit peerages from their parent (and thus, since they cannot be heirs, if a peer adopts a son and he is the oldest son, he would use the styles of younger sons). For example, actress Nimmy March, the daughter of The Duke and Duchess of Richmond, was immediately elevated to Lady Naomi Gordon-Lennox on 30 April 2004.

Note that Scottish peerages' rules for courtesy titles and styles differ.

Summary

Indirect inheritance
Occasionally, a peer succeeds to a peerage upon the death of a relative who is not one of his or her parents. When this happens, the relatives of the new peer may be allowed to use the courtesy titles or styles which would have been accorded them if the new peer had succeeded a parent or grandparent in the title.

For instance, Rupert Ponsonby, 7th Baron de Mauley, succeeded his uncle in 2002. His brother George had no title, as their father was only the younger son of a peer and was never actually Baron de Mauley. However, in 2003, George was granted, by Warrant of Precedence from Queen Elizabeth II, the style and precedence that would have been his, had his father survived to inherit the barony, becoming The Honourable George Ponsonby. Precedence in such circumstances is usually granted but is not automatic.

Spouses of peers 
The wife of a substantive peer is legally entitled to the privileges of peerage: she is said to have a "life estate" in her husband's dignity. Thus a duke's wife is titled a "duchess", a marquess's wife a "marchioness", an earl's wife a "countess", a viscount's wife a "viscountess" and a baron's wife a "baroness". Despite being referred to as a "peeress", she is not a peer in her own right. However, this is considered a legal title, unlike the social titles of a peer's children.

The wives of eldest sons of peers hold their titles on the same basis as their husbands, i.e. by courtesy. Thus the wife of the Marquess of Douro is known as the "Marchioness of Douro".

Husbands 
In the case of a woman who is a substantive peer in her own right, by succession or by first creation (i.e. ennoblement, most commonly in recent times under the Life Peerages Act 1958), her husband acquires no distinction in right of his wife. Thus, the husband of The Baroness Bottomley of Nettlestone has no courtesy title; he was simply called "Mr Peter Bottomley" until he was knighted and became "Sir Peter Bottomley".

In 2012, Conservative MP Oliver Colvile put forward a Ten Minute Rule bill to allow the spouse of a woman who holds an honour, if he or she enters civil partnership or marriage, to assume the title The Honourable. This bill stalled, and was not passed by the end of the Parliament. In 2013, there was a private member's bill in the House of Lords introduced by Conservative excepted hereditary peer Lord Lucas to the same effect which was similarly not passed.

Widows 
If a prince or peer dies, his wife's style does not change unless the new peer is a married man (or a woman, if the succession permits); traditionally the widowed peeress puts "Dowager" in her style, i.e. "The Most Hon. The Marchioness of London" becomes "The Most Hon. The Dowager Marchioness of London."

If a widowed peeress's son predeceases her, her daughter-in-law does not use the title of Dowager, but is styled, e.g. "The Most Hon. Mary, Marchioness of London", until her mother-in-law dies, at which point she may use the title of "Dowager Marchioness". In more recent times, some widows choose to be styled with their Christian names, instead of as Dowager, e.g. "Octavia, Lady Baden-Powell" ("Lady Octavia Baden-Powell" would incorrectly imply she was the daughter of a duke, marquess or earl).

Divorced wives and widows who remarry 
It used to be customary for women with higher titles from one marriage to retain them even on subsequent remarriage. As Lord Macnaughten put it in the case of Earl Cowley v Countess Cowley [1901] AC 450: "...everybody knows that it is a very common practice for peeresses (not being peeresses in their own right) after marrying commoners to retain the title lost by such marriage. It is not a matter of right. It is merely a matter of courtesy, and allowed by the usages of society." The divorce court, in the above case, granted the earl an injunction preventing his former wife from using his title; however this was overturned by the Court of Appeal, whose decision was confirmed by the House of Lords, on the grounds that ordinary courts of law lacked any jurisdiction in matters of honour.

The same practice was followed by widows who remarried. A prominent example was Catherine Parr, the last wife of Henry VIII, who continued to be known as Queen Catherine even after her marriage to The Lord Seymour of Sudeley (and, indeed, she disputed precedence with the wife of her brother-in-law the Duke of Somerset on this basis). This usage died out later in the twentieth century, and women who remarry now ordinarily take a new married name and do not retain their former title.

The College of Arms, acting on an opinion of the Lord Chancellor, holds that divorced peeresses "cannot claim the privileges or status of Peeresses which they derived from their husbands". While a divorced former wife of a peer is no longer a peeress, she may still use the title, styled with her forename prefixed to the title (without the definite article, the). Her forename is used primarily to differentiate her from any new wife of her former husband. However, should the former husband remain unmarried, the former wife may continue to use the title without her forename attached. Should a former wife of a peer remarry, she would lose the style of a divorced peeress and take on a style relating to her new husband.

On 21 August 1996 letters patent changed titles of divorced wives of British princes, depriving their former wives of the style of Royal Highness. For this reason Her Royal Highness The Princess of Wales after divorce became Diana, Princess of Wales. The same happened to Her Royal Highness The Duchess of York who became Sarah, Duchess of York.

Civil partners 
Civil partners of someone using a courtesy title are not entitled to use their partner's title.

Scottish courtesy titles
Laird is a courtesy title which applies to the owner of certain long-established Scottish estates; the title being attached to the estate. Traditionally, a laird is formally styled in the manner evident on the 1730 tombstone in a Scottish kirkyard (churchyard). It reads: "The Much Honoured [Forename (John)] [Surname (Grant)] Laird of [Lairdship (Glenmoriston)]". The section titled Scottish Feudal Baronies in Debrett's states that the use of the prefix "The Much Hon." is "correct", but that "most lairds prefer the unadorned name and territorial designation". The wife of a Laird is traditionally accorded the courtesy title of Lady.

Courtesy suffix of "Younger"
A form of courtesy title granted is the suffix of "The Younger" (also written as Yr or yr) at the end of the name. This title is granted to the Heir Apparent of a Feudal Baron and is placed at the end of his or her name (example— John Smith of Edinburgh, Younger, or John Smith, Younger of Edinburgh). The wife of a Younger may herself place the title at the end of her name. The holder is addressed as the younger (example—The Younger of Edinburgh).

Courtesy prefix of "Maid"
The courtesy prefix of "Maid" is granted to the eldest daughter of a Feudal Baron. If the eldest daughter is also the heir presumptive she may either hold the title "Younger" or the title "Maid". The title is customary and not automatically given. The title is placed at the end of the name (example—Miss Alice Joy, Maid of Newcastle). The holder is addressed as "The Maid of Barony".

Precedence status of courtesy titles
The courtesy titles and styles of children of peers are social, not legal. For this reason, in official documents, Lord John Smith is often referred to as John Smith, Esq., commonly called Lord John Smith; The Hon. Mrs Smith would be called Mary Jane, Mrs Smith, commonly called The Hon. Mary Jane Smith. Only peers in attendance at Parliament enjoy statutory precedence. There is, however, official precedence accorded at the Court of St James's that results from being the wife or child of a peer, and to which social styles are attached. The wives of peers, however, are peeresses and legally enjoy their titles in exactly the same manner as peeresses in their own right.

Children of peers can outrank certain actual peers. For instance, the daughter of a duke outranks a countess. However, if the daughter of a duke marries an earl, she drops to the rank of countess, because her courtesy title is subsumed in his substantive title. But, if that same daughter marries a commoner, she retains her rank. If that daughter marries the eldest son of an earl, though he may be a courtesy peer, she may keep her rank until the son inherits the earldom, when she must drop to the rank of countess.

Judicial courtesy titles

College of Justice in Scotland
In Scotland, Senators of the College of Justice (the judges of the Court of Session and the High Court of Justiciary as well as the Chairman of the Scottish Land Court) traditionally use the title Lord or Lady along with a surname or a territorial name. All Senators of the College have the honorific The Honourable before their titles, while those who are also Privy Counsellors or peers have the honorific The Right Honourable. Senators are made Privy Counsellors upon promotion to the Inner House. 

For example, Alexander Wylie is known as The Honourable Lord Kinclaven, whilst Ronald Mackay is known as The Right Honourable Lord Eassie. Some Senators also hold peerage titles, such as The Rt Hon. The Lady Clark of Calton, and these would be used in place of judicial titles.

Supreme Court of the United Kingdom

On creation of the Supreme Court of the United Kingdom on 1 October 2009, the first Justices already held life peerages as Lords of Appeal in Ordinary, and continued to hold them. The government announced that future appointees would not be created peers. The first non-peer appointed to the Supreme Court was Sir John Dyson, who took office on 19 April 2010. 

By royal warrant dated 10 December 2010, all Justices of the Supreme Court who are not already peers are granted the style Lord or Lady followed by a surname, territorial designation or a combination of both, for life. This was decided in order to avoid any distinction from the Scottish Senators of the College of Justice (see section above). Accordingly Sir John Dyson is styled Lord Dyson. Wives of male Supreme Court justices are styled as if they were wives of peers.

Nicholas Wilson, Lord Wilson of Culworth, appointed to the Supreme Court on 26 May 2011, was the first person to use a territorial name with his judicial courtesy title, adopting reference to Culworth in Northamptonshire.

Professional courtesy titles
The title of "Doctor" (or the abbreviation "Dr") is used as a courtesy title in a number of fields by professionals who do not hold doctoral degrees. It is commonly used in this manner by qualified medical practitioners (except surgeons) and by qualified dentists. The Royal College of Veterinary Surgeons also allows the use of "Doctor" as a courtesy title by its members though they must make clear in writing that they are vets and not medical doctors or holders of research degrees to ensure the public are not misled.

The title of Captain is used as a courtesy title by shipmasters in the merchant navy who do not hold the military rank of captain. It is also used in oral address for naval officers below the rank of captain who are in command of a ship.

See also 
 List of courtesy titles in the peerages of Britain and Ireland
 Forms of address in the United Kingdom

References and notes

Bibliography
Montague-Smith, P. (editor). (1979). Debrett's Peerage and Baronetage

External links 
"Courtesy Titles," Debrett's
 Glossary of Burke's Peerage and Baronetage - Courtesy title
 Royal Warrants of Precedence
 Use of courtesy titles by the Associated Press and on webforms
 Courtesy Titles 

 
Titles in the United Kingdom
Honorifics in the United Kingdom
Courtesy titles and honorifics
Peerages in the United Kingdom